Vinicius Alessandro Mingotti (born 7 January 2000) is a Brazilian footballer who plays for Tombense, on loan from Athletico Paranaense as a forward.

Career statistics

Club

Honours
Athletico Paranaense
Campeonato Paranaense: 2020

References

2000 births
Living people
Footballers from São Paulo (state)
Brazilian footballers
Association football forwards
Campeonato Brasileiro Série A players
Campeonato Paranaense players
Club Athletico Paranaense players